Jack Milton Warner (March 27, 1916 April 1, 1995) was an American film producer and son of legendary Hollywood movie mogul Jack L. Warner.

Early life
Jack M. Warner was born on March 27, 1916, the only child of Irma C. (née Salomon) and Jack L. Warner.  His father co-founded the film studio Warner Bros. with his brothers Harry Warner, Albert Warner, and Sam Warner.  According to the federal census of 1930, Jack—then 14 years old—lived with his mother and father in "Beverly Hills City", California, along with five live-in servants, who performed the daily duties of butler, housekeeper, cook, "Ladies Maid", and chauffeur. His family was Jewish.

Career
After graduating from the University of Southern California in 1938, Warner worked at Warner Bros.'s Burbank studio in the company's short-subject department. His experience in that position was later applied during his military service in World War II, when he helped to produce training films for the United States Army.  Following the war he returned to Warner Bros., joined its distribution company, and later became a producer. Among the early films he produced were The Hasty Heart (1949), starring Richard Todd and Ronald Reagan, The Admiral Was a Lady, and The Man Who Cheated Himself (1950) starring Lee J. Cobb and Jane Wyatt. Warner had also been in charge of Sunset Productions, a television production and licensing subsidiary of Warner Bros.

In 1958 Warner was dismissed from his position at Warner Bros. by his father. The two had become estranged after the elder Warner divorced his first wife Irma, Jack's mother, in 1935. Jack was never reconciled to his father's new wife Ann Page.  The son learned only through announcements in the film industry's trade press that he had lost his job. He later wrote a novel Bijou Dream based loosely on his relationship with his father, who died in 1978.

Jack M. Warner in 1957 appeared as a contestant on You Bet Your Life, a televised quiz show hosted by Groucho Marx.  Warner at the time served as president of the Mental Health Foundation of Los Angeles County, California; and he competed on the quiz show to win money, which he intended to contribute to the foundation.  Although Warner did not win the "big money" on the show, he did win $250.

Personal life and death
Warner married Connecticut native Barbara Richman in 1948. Together, they had three children.  Warner died of cancer of the lymph nodes on April 1, 1995, at age 79 at Cedars-Sinai Medical Center in Los Angeles.   His body was interred at Hillside Memorial Park in Culver City, California.

References and notes

External links 
 

20th-century American businesspeople
1916 births
1995 deaths
20th-century American Jews
Burials at Hillside Memorial Park Cemetery
Film producers from California
People from Los Angeles
University of Southern California alumni
Jack M.